Yinka Ilori  (born 1986) is a British artist and designer. His work includes architecture, interior design, graphic and textile design, sculpture, and furniture design. It includes storytelling using design as a medium, while also referencing his British and Nigerian heritage. Ilori is known for the bold use of bright colours in his work and his playful designs for furniture and public spaces. The New York Times Style Magazine described him as "one of '12 Talents Shaping the Design World'", and Abitare referred to him as belonging "to a more open-minded and inclusive generation that sees design as offering a possible response to social and environmental changes."

Early life and education
Ilori grew up in a multicultural neighbourhood on Essex Road in Islington and attended St Jude and St Paul's Church of England Primary School.

His father was a store manager for B&Q and his mother worked as an events caterer. Ilori recalls the vibrant outfits worn by his parents' friends and family at house parties when he was little. Visiting Nigeria as a child had an important impact on him and helped him better understand his family’s cultural heritage.

Ilori studied art and design (with a focus on furniture and product design) at London Metropolitan University from 2006 to 2009.

Career

After completing his degree, Ilori worked as an intern with furniture designer Lee Broom. His first solo work was supported by a £3,500 grant from The Prince’s Trust. He began his professional practice in 2011, initially by upcycling second-hand furniture, and taking inspiration from the colour and design aesthetic of West African textiles. Early in his career, he worked at a Marks & Spencer store in Moorgate. The company later engaged him to design products, including a recyclable carrier bag.

Ilori’s mixed cultural heritage is an influence in his work. The Nigerian parables his parents told him as a child have become a major source of inspiration for his designs. In 2013, one such parable, "No matter how long the neck of a giraffe is, it still cannot see the future", led to a five-piece collection of chairs which Ilori transformed from broken and cast-off furniture into abstract, brightly coloured new works of art "to share a lesson from this childhood story — that we should not be judgemental".

More recently, he has created public works and installations such as Happy Street at Nine Elms, in which he transformed a railway bridge underpass with brightly coloured murals; The Colour Palace at Dulwich Picture Gallery,  a temporary pavilion that was described as "a testament to universal themes of [colour], pattern, and celebration"; and Get Up Stand Up at Somerset House, which "celebrates half a century of black creativity in the UK" and was called "a riot of colour and pattern".

Ilori founded his design studio in 2015. The practice includes architects and designers for whom colour is a key interest. As his team has expanded, Ilori has been able to take on larger-scale architectural and interior design projects. His clients include companies such as Adidas, Kvadrat, Lego, Meta, Nike, Pepsi, and SCP, as well as the NHS Foundation Trust for which he created works for the Chelsea and Westminster Hospital, and Springfield University Hospital.

In 2020 he launched an eponymous homeware brand which manufactures and distributes his own products, and he was also awarded the Emerging Design Medal by the London Design Festival.

Ilori collaborated with British stage designer Es Devlin on the design of the Britannia statuettes for the 2021 Brit Awards.

In 2022 Ilori designed a playground named The Flamboyance of Flamingos in Parsloes Park, East London. In the same year, the Design Museum in London staged an exhibition of his work featuring 100 of his projects as well as "Canary Wharf’s first ever basketball court." His work has also been exhibited in museums such as the V&A Dundee, Vitra Design Museum in Basel, and the Guggenheim Bilbao, and is held in the collection of the Metropolitan Museum in New York as part of the Afrofuturist Period Room.

Ilori has said, "I use colour as a way of starting a conversation. It's quite a nice way of opening up a topic and softening what could be a harsh reality", and is quoted in The Guardian as saying, “My work is very much about inclusivity and how people enjoy design.” He lives and works in London, and was made a Member of the British Empire (MBE) in the 2021 New Year's Honours.

According to the architect David Adjaye Ilori's work, "transcends just function and product and acts as a device for cultural memory."

Selected projects
2019 Colour Palace, Dulwich Picture Gallery
2019 Happy Street, London Festival of Architecture and Wandsworth Council
2020 Colorama skate park, La Condition Publique cultural centre, Lille, France
2021 Laundrette of Dreams, Lego Collaboration
2021 Transparency in Shades of Colour
2021 Bring London Together
2021 The Sound of Movement, Labrum London, Spring-Summer 2022 show
2021 Lick x Yinka Ilori Maximalist Brights, Wallpaper collection
2021 sonsbeek20→24 Sonsbeek, Arnhem
2021 Dodge, Somerset House
2022 Layers of Movement, Meta, London
2023 From Greener Pastures, Labrum London, Autumn-Winter 2023 show
2023 Public Art Piece, The Rowe (Central House, former London Metropolitan University Cass School of Architecture), London

Exhibitions

Solo
2013 It Started With a Parable, Jaguar Shoes, London Design Week
2014 This is Where It Started, The Whitespace Gallery, Lagos
2015 If Chairs Could Talk, The Shop At Bluebird
2022 Yinka Ilori: Parables for Happiness, the Design Museum, London

Group
2014 Africa Calling, Africa Utopia, Southbank Centre, London
2015 Home Affairs, Now Gallery, London
2015 Making Africa, Vitra Design Museum, Basel. Guggenheim Museum Bilbao
2020 Knit!, Kvadrat, Copenhagen

Publications 

 Pricegore & Yinka Ilori: Dulwich Pavilion. Dingle Price, Alex Gore, Job Floris, Sumayya Vally, Yinka Ilori Studio, Pricegore. Zurich. 2021. . .
 Reynolds, Jason (2018). For every one. London. . . (cover design by Yinka Ilori)

References

External links

Yinka Ilori on the feelings and emotions of chairs, interview at Design Indaba
In the studio: artist and designer Yinka Ilori, short film from the Design Museum
Artist Yinka Ilori teams up with kids to build the "Launderette of Dreams", short film
The making of the “Launderette of Dreams” by Yinka Ilori, short film

Alumni of London Metropolitan University
Architects from London
BRIT Award trophy designers
Designers from London
English furniture designers
English graphic designers
English interior designers
English people of Nigerian descent
Living people
1987 births
People from Islington (district)
21st-century English architects
Members of the Order of the British Empire
Industrial design